Rhys Huber (born June 24, 1986) is a Canadian actor. He has done English voice work for animation and anime. His most notable role is Li Showron in the Cardcaptors dub.

Animation/Anime Roles
 Cardcaptors as Li Showron
 Cardcaptors: The Movie as Li Showron
 Dragon Booster as Pyrahh's Younger Brother (ep. 3)
 Nilus the Sandman as Gus (ep. 1)
 Rainbow Fish as Rainbow Fish
 Ranma ½ as Satori (ep. 135)
 Salty's Lighthouse as Salty
 Spider-Man Unlimited as Shayne Jones
 What About Mimi? as Russell

External links

1986 births
Living people
Canadian male voice actors
Canadian people of Welsh descent
People from North Vancouver
Male actors from British Columbia